The 2012 Hilton HHonors Skate America was the first event of six in the 2012–13 ISU Grand Prix of Figure Skating, a senior-level international invitational competition series. It was held at the ShoWare Center in Kent, Washington on October 19–21. Medals were awarded in the disciplines of men's singles, ladies' singles, pair skating, and ice dancing. Skaters earned points toward qualifying for the 2012–13 Grand Prix Final.

Eligibility
Skaters who reached the age of 14 before July 1, 2012 were eligible to compete on the senior Grand Prix circuit.

Prior to competing in a Grand Prix event, skaters were required to have earned the following scores (3/5 of the top scores at the 2012 World Championships):

Entries
The entries were as follows.

Overview
Yuzuru Hanyu posted a world record score in the men's short program for a ten-point lead over teammate Takahiko Kozuka, with American Jeremy Abbott in third. Kozuka won the gold medal after placing first in the free skating, Hanyu dropped to second overall, and Tatsuki Machida rounded out a Japanese sweep of the podium by winning bronze, his first Grand Prix medal.

American Ashley Wagner led after the ladies' short program, followed by Russia's Adelina Sotnikova and American Christina Gao. Wagner then placed first in the free skating to win her first GP gold, while Gao rose to take the silver, her first GP medal, and Sotnikova slipped to third.

Russia's Tatiana Volosozhar / Maxim Trankov placed first in the pairs' short program ahead of China's Pang Qing / Tong Jian and Americans Caydee Denney / John Coughlin. The pairs maintained their positions in the free skating. Volosozhar / Trankov won their third GP title, Pang / Tong finished second, and Denney / Coughlin took the bronze, their first Grand Prix medal.

Americans Meryl Davis / Charlie White won the short dance, ahead of Canada's Kaitlyn Weaver / Andrew Poje and Russia's Ekaterina Bobrova / Dmitri Soloviev. Davis / White also placed first in the free dance to win their third consecutive Skate America title, while Bobrova and Soloviev moved up to win the silver, their fifth medal on the GP series, and Weaver and Poje took the bronze, their sixth GP medal.

Results

Men

Ladies

Pairs

Ice dancing

References

External links
 Official website of 2012 Skate America
 Entries
 Starting orders/Detailed results

Skate America, 2012
Skate America